Claude Lévêque (born 27 February 1953) is a French contemporary installation, sculpture, and new media, artist, best known for his work in neon. Lévêque, a graduate of the École des Beaux-Arts in Bourges, received considerable attention for his April 2014 neon installation in I.M. Pei's Louvre Pyramid and its accompanying October 2015 exhibition, Sous Le Plus Grand Chapiteau Du Monde.

In 2009 Lévêque represented France at the 53rd Venice Biennale.

Lévêque lives and works in Montreuil, Seine-Saint-Denis.

Lévêque has been accused of rape of minors in 2019 and is currently under criminal investigation

References 

1953 births
Living people
French contemporary artists
New media artists
21st-century French male artists
20th-century French male artists